Y:Cube is a three-storey block of 36 one-bedroom affordable housing flats, owned by YMCA St Paul’s Group. They include George William Court, 148 Clay Avenue and flats 36A-E Woodstock Way in Mitcham in London, England. George William Court was named after the founder of YMCA, George Williams.

Construction history

Construction of the flats started in March 2015 and were completed in the August of the same year. The flats were built by SIG plc at a construction cost of £1,600,000 and they were designed by Rogers Stirk Harbour + Partners, with Ivan Harbour being the lead architect. The project managers were AECOM. The flats were constructed off-site in Derbyshire before being transported to London.

The block of flats were opened on 8 September 2015 by the then Minister of State for Housing and Planning, Brandon Lewis MP.

Awards
2015 AIA UK Awards Shortlist
2015 Edison Awards - Silver medal in the ‘Social Solutions’ category
2016 World Architecture Festival 2016 - Completed Housing - Shortlist
2016 Urban Land Institute J C Nichols Award for Visionaries in Urban Development
2016 RIBA Journal MacEwen Award - Shortlist

References

External links
Official webpage of Y:Cube
Y:Cube on the Rogers Stirk Harbour + Partners website

2005 establishments in England
Residential buildings in London
Housing estates in London
Richard Rogers buildings
Buildings and structures in the London Borough of Merton
YMCA buildings